Gajek may refer to:

People
 Artur Gajek (born 1985), German road bicycle racer
 Sergiusz Gajek (born 1949), Polish apostolic visitor

Places
 Gajek, Greater Poland Voivodeship, Poland